Daniel Hamilton Richards (February 12, 1808February 6, 1877) was an American newspaper publisher, Democratic politician, and Wisconsin pioneer.  He was the founder and original printer of the Milwaukee Advertiser—the first newspaper printed in Milwaukee.  He also served five terms in the Wisconsin State Assembly, representing the north side of Milwaukee.

Biography

Born in Burlington, New York, Richards moved to Milwaukee in 1835, when it was still part of the Michigan Territory. In 1836, he started a newspaper the Milwaukee Advertiser—the third newspaper published in what is now the state of Wisconsin. Richards was a Democrat and served in the Wisconsin State Assembly in 1868, 1870, 1871, 1874, and 1875.

Richards died of a stroke in Milwaukee in February 1877.

His eldest son, Arthur B. Richards, enlisted with the 4th Wisconsin Cavalry Regiment during the American Civil War and died of disease at Baton Rouge, Louisiana.

Electoral history

Wisconsin Assembly (1869, 1870, 1871)

| colspan="6" style="text-align:center;background-color: #e9e9e9;"| General Election, November 2, 1869

| colspan="6" style="text-align:center;background-color: #e9e9e9;"| General Election, November 8, 1870

| colspan="6" style="text-align:center;background-color: #e9e9e9;"| General Election, November 7, 1871

Wisconsin Assembly (1873, 1874)

| colspan="6" style="text-align:center;background-color: #e9e9e9;"| General Election, November 4, 1873

| colspan="6" style="text-align:center;background-color: #e9e9e9;"| General Election, November 3, 1874

References

External links
 

1808 births
1877 deaths
People from Burlington, New York
Politicians from Milwaukee
Editors of Wisconsin newspapers
19th-century American journalists
American male journalists
19th-century American male writers
19th-century American politicians
Democratic Party members of the Wisconsin State Assembly